Francis Bangs may refer to:

 Francis N. Bangs (1828–1885), New York lawyer
 Francis S. Bangs (1855–1920), New York attorney